Judge Friedman may refer to:

Bernard A. Friedman (born 1943), judge of the United States District Court for the Eastern District of Michigan
Daniel Mortimer Friedman (1916–2011), judge of the United States Court of Appeals for the Federal Circuit and chief judge of the United States Court of Claims
Jerome B. Friedman (born 1943), judge of the United States District Court for the Eastern District of Virginia
Monroe Mark Friedman (1895–1978), judge of the United States District Court for the Northern District of California and judge of the Superior Court of California
Paul L. Friedman (born 1944), judge of the United States District Court for the District of Columbia

See also
Abraham Lincoln Freedman (1904–1971), judge of the United States Court of Appeals for the Third Circuit
Frank Harlan Freedman (1924–2003), judge of the United States District Court for the District of Massachusetts